Nora Dorothy Bernard (June 25, 1890 – December 14, 1955) was an American actress of the silent era. She appeared in nearly 90 films between 1908 and 1956.

Biography
She was born Nora Dorothy Bernard in Port Elizabeth, British Cape Colony, now part of South Africa, to William H Bernard and Roy Elizabeth Ayrd. Her father was from Auckland, New Zealand, and her mother was born in Sligo, Ireland. Although her birth date is listed as July 25, 1890 in many biographies, her death certificate and U.S. passport both state her birth date as June 25, 1890. An only child, she spent her formative years in Portland, Oregon where her father worked as a stock company manager and was a well-respected actor. As a child actress, Bernard appeared in several plays in Portland under "Dot Bernard" in the Baker Theater Company. Her stepmother, actress Nan Ramsey, also appeared in several productions. In 1905, her family moved to Los Angeles, California, and her father accepted a position to manage the Balasco theater. 

Bernard worked with stock theater companies in San Francisco, Los Angeles, Portland, and Detroit. She also performed in vaudeville. She first worked in films in 1911 with D. W. Griffith and the Biograph Company. On television, she portrayed Margaret, an Irish cook and housekeeper, in Life With Father after originating the role on stage.

She was married to actor A.H. Van Buren on July 5, 1909, in Washington D.C., and they had a daughter named Marjorie "Midge" Van Buren born in Jamaica, New York.

Bernard died of a heart attack at her Hollywood home on December 14, 1955, aged 65. Her body was cremated, and her ashes were stored at Chapel of the Pines Crematory in Los Angeles.

Selected filmography

 A Woman's Way (1908)
 An Awful Moment (1908)
 The Cord of Life (1909)
 The Girls and Daddy (1909)
 The Woman from Mellon's (1910)
 A Flash of Light (1910)
 Ramona (1910)
 The Two Paths (1911)
 His Trust Fulfilled (1911)
 His Trust (1911)
 For His Son (1912)
 The Root of Evil (1912)
 A Sister's Love (1912)
 A String of Pearls (1912)
 The Girl and Her Trust (1912)
 The Goddess of Sagebrush Gulch (1912)
 One Is Business, the Other Crime (1912)
 An Outcast Among Outcasts (1912)
 The House of Darkness (1913)
 The Sheriff's Baby (1913)
 Near to Earth (1913)
 A Chance Deception (1913)
 The Little Tease (1913)
 The Song of Hate (1915)
 The Little Gypsy (1915)
 A Soldier's Oath (1915)
 A Man of Sorrow (1916)
 The Bondman (1916)
 The Final Payment (1917)
 The Rainbow (1917)
 The Accomplice (1917)
 Little Women (1918)
 The Great Shadow (1920)

References
 
California Death Index, Ancestry.com.
U.S. Passport Applications, 1795–1925, Ancestry.com.
District of Columbia Wedding Applications, https://web.archive.org/web/20101124092809/http://pilot.familysearch.org/recordsearch/start.html#givenName=A.H.&searchType=close&placeId=1&surname=van%20buren&p=recordResults&alivePlaceLoc1=United%20States.

External links

1890 births
1955 deaths
South African emigrants to the United States
American film actresses
American silent film actresses
People from Port Elizabeth
20th-century American actresses
American child actresses
American stage actresses
American television actresses